During the 2007–08 German football season, Hamburger SV competed in the Bundesliga.

Season summary
Hamburg improved to finish fourth, though they were 10 points off Champions League qualification.

First-team squad
Squad at end of season

Left club during season

Competitions

Bundesliga

League table

Intertoto Cup

Third round

UEFA Cup

Second qualifying round

First round

Group stage

Round of 32

Round of 16

References

Notes

Hamburger SV
Hamburger SV seasons